Alicja Danuta Olechowska (born 10 February 1956) is a Polish politician. She was elected to the Sejm on 25 September 2005, getting 6395 votes in 20 Warsaw district as a candidate from the Civic Platform list.

She was also a member of Sejm 2001-2005.

See also
Members of Polish Sejm 2005-2007

External links
Alicja Olechowska - parliamentary page – includes declarations of interest, voting record, and transcripts of speeches.

Members of the Polish Sejm 2005–2007
Members of the Polish Sejm 2001–2005
Women members of the Sejm of the Republic of Poland
Civic Platform politicians
1956 births
Living people
21st-century Polish women politicians
Members of the Polish Sejm 2007–2011
Members of the Polish Sejm 2011–2015